The Dallison was a British cyclecar.

Dallison may also refer to:

 Dallison, West Virginia, a community in the United States
 Dallison baronets, English Baronetcy created in 1644
 Charles Dallison ( 1648) officer during the English Civil War
 Tom Dallison, English footballer

See also
 Dalison